United States v. John may refer to the following legal cases:

United States v. John (1978), 437 U.S. 634 (1978), on state jurisdiction relating to Indian reservations
United States v. John (2010), 597 F.3d 263 (5th Cir. 1983), interpreting the Computer Fraud and Abuse Act 

Case law disambiguation pages